Danny Nikolic (born 19 November 1974), is a jockey of Macedonian descent in Australian Thoroughbred horse racing.

His wins included:

 Blue Diamond Stakes on Paint (1996)
 Caulfield Cup on Mummify (2003)
 Caulfield Stakes (2004)
 Turnbull Stakes (2006)
 Rosehill Guineas (2009)
 VRC Sires Produce Stakes on My Duke (1996)

On 15 May 2010, following a five-month investigation, Racing Victoria stewards laid nine charges against Danny Nikolic which included the serious allegations of improper practices and conduct prejudicial to the image of racing.

The Racing Appeals and Disciplinary Board, on 29 May 2010, cleared Nikolic of the charges of improper practices and conduct prejudicial to the image of racing, but fined him a total of $3,000 on five lesser charges to which he had pleaded guilty.

On Thursday, 3 November 2011, Nikolic won the Group 1 Crown Oaks aboard Mosheen.

References

 Danny Nikolic at Racing Victoria Limited
 Sraight from jockey Danny Nikolic's mouth

1974 births
Australian jockeys
Living people